Epelebodina is a genus of moths belonging to the family Tortricidae.

Species
Epelebodina concolorata Razowski, 2006

References

 , 2006, Acta Zoologica Cracoviensia 49B (1-2): 115-135.

External links
tortricidae.com

Polyorthini
Tortricidae genera
Taxa named by Józef Razowski